The Lewis & Clark Bicentennial silver dollar is a commemorative silver dollar issued by the United States Mint in 2004. The coin portrays American explorers Meriwether Lewis and William Clark, the leaders of the 1804-1806 Lewis and Clark Expedition.

See also

 List of United States commemorative coins and medals (2000s)
 United States commemorative coins
Westward Journey "Peace Medal" nickel

References

2004 establishments in the United States
Cultural depictions of Meriwether Lewis and William Clark
Modern United States commemorative coins